Huang Jun may refer to:
 Huang Jun (author) (1890–1937), Chinese man of letters, author and spy
 Huang Jun (footballer) (born 1990), Chinese footballer